Benjamin Kololli (born 15 May 1992) is a Kosovan professional footballer who plays as a winger for Japanese club Shimizu S-Pulse and the Kosovo national team.

Club career

Zürich
On 21 July 2018, Kololli signed a three-year contract with Swiss Super League club Zürich. Seven days later, he made his debut in a 0–2 away win against Grasshoppers after coming on as a substitute at 70th minute in place of Marco Schönbächler.

Shimizu S-Pulse
On 14 July 2021, Kololli signed a two-and-a-half year contract with J1 League club Shimizu S-Pulse. Nine days later, the club confirmed that Kololli's transfer was permanent and he received squad number 32. On 18 August 2021, he made his debut with Shimizu S-Pulse in the 2021 Emperor's Cup fourth round against Kawasaki Frontale after coming on as a substitute at 46th minute in place of Keita Nakamura.

International career
On 30 August 2016, Kololli received a call-up from Kosovo for a 2018 FIFA World Cup qualification match against Finland. On 12 November 2016, he made his debut with Kosovo in a 2018 FIFA World Cup qualification against Turkey after being named in the starting line-up.

Personal life
Kololli was born in Aigle, Switzerland from Kosovan parents from Lipjan.

Career statistics

Club

International

International goals

Scores and results list Kosovo's goal tally first.

|-
|1.
|rowspan="2"|
|rowspan="2"|Fadil Vokrri Stadium, Pristina, Kosovo
|rowspan="3"|
|align=center|1–0
|rowspan="2" style="text-align:center"|3–1
|rowspan="3"|2018–19 UEFA Nations League D
|rowspan="2"|
|-
|2.
|align=center|3–1
|-
|3.
|
|National Stadium, Ta' Qali, Malta
|align=center|2–0
|align=center|5–0
|
|-
|4.
|
|Stadio Ennio Tardini, Parma, Italy
|
|align=center|1–1
|align=center|1–1 
|2020–21 UEFA Nations League C
|
|}

References

External links

1992 births
Living people
People from Lipljan
People from Aigle
Association football midfielders
Kosovan footballers
Kosovo international footballers
Kosovan expatriate footballers
Kosovan expatriate sportspeople in Japan
Swiss men's footballers
Swiss 1. Liga (football) players
FC Monthey players
Swiss Promotion League players
Swiss Challenge League players
FC Le Mont players
FC Biel-Bienne players
Swiss Super League players
FC Sion players
BSC Young Boys players
FC Lausanne-Sport players
FC Zürich players
J1 League players
Shimizu S-Pulse players
Sportspeople from the canton of Vaud